La Poste Senegal is the public company in charge of postal services in Senegal. La Poste Senegal is a member of the Universal Postal Union.

History 
The appearance of the postal system in Senegal coincides with the country's colonial conquest, and it served as a critical tool of colonialism. Before colonization, no organized postal system existed. Instead, information was exchanged on foot or horseback under the services of kings and local rulers. Before, the transmission of important messages across short distances was done with the help of drums played to a specific beat. This was used to announce events such as weddings, births, baptisms, deaths, enemy attacks, and preparation for a military expedition.

Under colonialism, a quicker method of communication appeared. And for rulers, communication with other rulers and with their subjects spread throughout the country became a more and more pressing need. From thereon, they had in their courts an epistolary service whose task was to carry correspondences.

People speaking Arabic, French, and other African languages were in charge of this system which was starting to resemble a postal service. In Senegal, a full-fledged postal service was in operation by 1626, the year marking the start of postal communication between Senegal and France. In 38 years, the first ships from the merchant associations of Rouen and Dieppe were carrying postal packages between the two countries.

In 1758, these associations were replaced by the French East India Company in particular, which was now in charge of the postal transport between Europe and African coast.

In 1781, Senegal was made a colony of France, increasing communications between the two countries.

In 1850, the postal service was incorporated into a new organization, and in 1851, the postal transport between Gorée and Saint-Louis is transferred to people who crossed the river then the sea by simple pirogues.

The year 1855 marks the beginning of the conquest of the colony's interior by Louis Faidherbe begins, where previously the French only controlled trading posts along the coast. A postal service for official communication becomes necessary. Plans were put in place to set up telegraph lines throughout the country.

It's only in 1879 that Senegal received a real postal structure modelled on that of France.

In 1900, the postal service was at its zenith. The principal centres were all linked together and to the capital, and a system of telegraph lines covered almost the entire colony.

Land, maritime, and fluvial transport were used for the postal services. In places without rivers, seaside, or railways, people were used to travel between villages on foot.

Directors-General Since 1962 

• Ibrahima Ndiaye DG OPT from December 1962 to January 1973

• Ndaraw Cissé DG OPT from January 1973 to June 1976

• Mahady Diallo DG OPT from June 1976 to November 1978

• Assane Ndiaye DG OPT from November 1978 to November 1983

• El Hadj Malick Sy DG OPT/OPCE from November 1983 to June 1987

• Serigne Ahmadou Camara DG OPCE from June 1987 to December 1993

• Ibrahima Sarr DG OPCE from December 1993 to May 2000

• Iba Joseph Basse DG La Poste from May 2000 to August 2004

• Mamadou Thior DG La Poste from August 2004 to December 2013

• Siré Dia DG La Poste since January 2013

Company Vision 
The postal sector is seen as an accelerator of inclusive development and an essential part of the world economy.

Given the great speed of changes that affect the world, the Universal Postal Union's vision is more current than ever. With its role in accelerating the development of the postal sector, the UPU contributes to the development of the world economy.

This vision can only become a reality if it is linked with a reaffirmed commitment toward the Universal Postal Union's mission. This mission uses a global approach to meet the priorities and the need of every country and region.

Company Mission
"To stimulate sustainable development of universal postal services of quality, ease, and accessibility to facilitate communication between the residents of this planet by:
 Guaranteeing the free circulation of the post on a single postal territory made up of interconnected networks,
 Encouraging the adoption of common norms that are equitable and favor use of technology,
 Ensuring co-operation and interaction between necessary parties,
 Favoring an efficient technical co-operation; and
 Staying aware of the satisfaction of the evolving needs of clients."

External links 

 Official website

References 

Communications in Senegal
Companies of Senegal
Senegal